The Bridge of Prozelo is a bridge in the civil parish of Ferreiros, Prozelo e Besteiros, municipality of Amares, in the Portuguese district of Braga, that crosses the Cávado River.

History
Sometime during the middle of the 14th century, the bridge was constructed, owing to the acronyms on the structure.

The roadway had its origins in Braga, crossing the Cávado River over the port bridge in the direction of Amares (where a shelter existed), bisecting at the path to Geira, to the east, or to north, passing the River Homen at the bridge of Caldelas/Rodas in the direction of Ponte da Barca. Passage along the Cávado before the construction of the port bridge was made to the west between Ribeiro and Lago.

Architecture
The bridge is situated in a rural, isolated position over the River Cávado, between the parishes of Pousada (in Braga) and Prozelo (in Amares), in the locality of Ponte do Porto,  along the Estrada Nacional E.N.205 linking Amares and Póvoa de Lanhoso. There are several houses that line the roadway near the entrance-way to the north of the bridge. The banks of the river is covered in vegetation.

The four arches in the horizontal section of the bridge are broken and the high part of the three piers that separate them have eyelets. The remaining arcs, ten in number, have unequal dimensions and shape. It includes buttresses with triangular and rectangular talhamares, with the a platform protected by low parapets in granite.

References

Notes

Sources

See also
 List of bridges in Portugal

Pedestrian bridges in Portugal
Prozelo
Ponte Prozelo
Buildings and structures in Amares
Bridges over the Cávado River
Listed bridges in Portugal